Ectemnorhinini is a weevil tribe in the subfamily Entiminae.

Genera 
Bothrometopus – Canonopsis – Christensenia – Disker – Ectemnorhinus – Pachnobium – Palirhoeus

References 

 Alonso-Zarazaga, M.A.; Lyal, C.H.C. 1999: A world catalogue of families and genera of Curculionoidea (Insecta: Coleoptera) (excepting Scolytidae and Platypodidae). Entomopraxis, Barcelona.
 Chapelin-Viscardi, J.-D.; Voisin, J.-F.; Ponel, P.; Van der Putten, N. 2010: [Pachnobium dreuxi, n. g., n. sp. discovered as a fossil and still living in the Crozet Islands (Coleoptera: Curculionidae: Ectemnorrhininae).] Annales de la Société Entomologique de France (n.s.), 46: 125–131. 
 Chown, S.L. 1989: Habitat use and diet as biogeographic indicators for subantarctic Ectemnorhinini (Coleoptera: Curculionidae). Antarctic science, 1: 23–30. 
 Chown, S.L. 1994: Historical ecology of sub-Antarctic weevils (Coleoptera: Curculionidae): patterns and processes on isolated islands. Journal of natural history, 28: 411–433. 
 Chown, S.L.; Klok, C.J. 2001: Habitat use, diet and body size of Heard Island weevils. Polar biology, 24: 706–712. 
 Chown, S.L.; Klok, C.J. 2003: Water-Balance Characteristics Respond to Changes in Body Size in Subantarctic Weevils. Physiological and biochemical zoology, 76: 634–643. 
 Chown, S.L.; Kuschel, G. 1994: New Bothrometopus species from Possession Island, Crozet Archipelago, with nomenclatural amendments and a key to its weevil fauna (Coleoptera: Curculionidae: Brachycerinae). African entomology, 2(2): 149–154. 
 Chown, S.L.; Scholtz, C.H. 1989: Cryptogam herbivory in Curculionidae (Coleoptera) from the sub-Antarctic Prince Edward Islands. Coleopterists bulletin, 43: 165–169.
 Chown, S.L.; Scholtz, C.H. 1990: Description of the larva of Christensenia antarctica Brinck with implications for the phylogeny of Ectemnorhinini (Coleoptera: Curculionidae). Coleopterists bulletin, 44: 255–264.
 Crafford, J.E.; Chown, S.L. 1991: Comparative nutritional ecology of bryophyte and angiosperm feeders in a sub-Antarctic weevil species complex (Coleoptera: Curculionidae). Ecological entomology, 16: 323–329. 
 Dreux, P.; Voisin, J.-F. 1989: Sur la systématique des genres de la sous-famille des Ectemnorrhininae (Coleoptera, Curculionidae). Nouvelle revue d'entomologie, 6: 111–118. 
 Kuschel, G. 1970: COLEOPTERA: CURCULIONIDAE OF HEARD ISLAND. Pacific insects monograph, 23: 255–260.
 Kuschel, G.; Chown, S.L. 1995: Phylogeny and systematics of the Ectemnorhinus-group of genera (Insecta : Coleoptera). Invertebrate taxonomy, 9: 841–863, 
 Lacordaire, T. 1863: Histoire Naturelle des Insectes. Genera des Coléoptères ou exposé méthodique et critique de tous les genres proposés jusqu'ici dans cet ordre d'insectes. Vol.: 6. Roret. Paris: 637 pp.
 Marvaldi, A.E. 1997: Higher Level Phylogeny of Curculionidae (Coleoptera: Curculionoidea) based mainly on Larval Characters, with Special Reference to Broad-Nosed Weevils. Cladistics, 13: 285–312. 
 May, B.M. 1970: IMMATURE STAGES OF CURCULIONIDAE OF HEARD ISLAND. Pacific insects monograph, 23: 261–270.
 Waterhouse, G.R. 1853: Descriptions of New Genera and Species of Curculionides. Transactions of the Entomological Society of London (n.s.), 2: 172-207

External links 

Entiminae
Beetle tribes